The Green Lift (Swedish: Gröna hissen) is a 1944 Swedish comedy film directed by Börje Larsson and starring Max Hansen, Sickan Carlsson and Gaby Stenberg. It was shot at the Sundbyberg Studios of Europa Film in Stockholm. The film's sets were designed by the art director Max Linder. It is based on the Broadway play Fair and Warmer by Avery Hopwood. Larsson later remade it into a 1952 film of the same name.

Cast
 Max Hansen as	Billy
 Sickan Carlsson as 	Lillan
 Gaby Stenberg as 	Ulla
 Karl-Arne Holmsten as 	Peter
 Håkan Westergren as 	Filip
 Ernst Eklund as Direktör Bang
 John Botvid as 	Portvakten
 Julia Cæsar as 	Portvaktsfrun 
 Inga-Bodil Vetterlund as 	Margit
 Torsten Hillberg as Hammar
 Gustaf Lövås as Porter 
 Ludde Juberg as 	Porter
 Börje Mellvig as 	Hotel Clerk
 Magnus Kesster as 	Head Waiter
 Hugo Tranberg as 	Taxi Driver
 Anna-Lisa Söderblom as Secretary 
 Gudrun Moberg as 	Greta
 Barbro Ribbing as Marianne
 Eivor Engelbrektsson as Vera
 Marianne Gyllenhammar as Sonja
 Lill Astri Stuge as 	Lady 
 Greta Liming as 	Lillan's Friend
 Carl Andersson as 	Man 
 Greta Forsgren as 	Assistant at the Dog's Barber Shop 
 Gustaf Färingborg as 	Gentleman on the Street 
 Lisbeth Hedendahl as 	Young Woman with Glasses and Black Hat 
 Nils Hultgren as 	Lövgren 
 Margareta Jungmarker as 	Britta, Ulla's Friend 
 Arne Källerud as 	Bowling Player 
 Elly Nylén as 	Woman at the Restaurant

References

Bibliography 
 Bock, Hans-Michael and Bergfelder, Tim. The Concise Cinegraph: An Encyclopedia of German Cinema. Berghahn Books, 2009.

External links 
 

1944 films
Swedish comedy films
1944 comedy films
1940s Swedish-language films
Films directed by Börje Larsson
Swedish films based on plays
1940s Swedish films